The invariant set postulate concerns the possible relationship between fractal geometry and quantum mechanics and in particular the hypothesis that the former can assist in resolving some of the challenges posed by the latter. It is underpinned by nonlinear dynamical systems theory and black hole thermodynamics.

Author
The proposer of the postulate is climate scientist and physicist Tim Palmer. Palmer completed a PhD at the University of Oxford under Dennis Sciama, the same supervisor that Stephen Hawking had and then worked with Hawking himself at the University of Cambridge on supergravity theory. He later switched to meteorology and has established a reputation pioneering ensemble forecasting. He now works at the European Centre for Medium-Range Weather Forecasts in Reading, England.

Overview
Palmer argues that the postulate may help to resolve some of the paradoxes of quantum mechanics that have been discussed since the Bohr–Einstein debates of the 1920s and 30s and which remain unresolved. The idea backs Einstein's view that quantum theory is incomplete, but also agrees with Bohr's contention that quantum systems are not independent of the observer.

The key idea involved is that there exists a state space for the Universe, and that the state of the entire Universe can be expressed as a point in this state space. This state space can then be divided into "real" and "unreal" sets (parts), where, for example, the states where the Nazis lost WW2 are in the "real" set, and the states where the Nazis won WW2 are in the "unreal" set of points. The partition of state space into these two sets is unchanging, making the sets invariant.

If the Universe is a complex system affected by chaos then its invariant set (a fixed state of rest) is likely to be a fractal. According to Palmer this could resolve problems posed by the Kochen–Specker theorem, which appears to indicate that physics may have to abandon the idea of any kind of objective reality, and the apparent paradox of action at a distance. In a paper submitted to the Proceedings of the Royal Society he indicates how the idea can account for quantum uncertainty and problems of "contextuality". For example, exploring the quantum problem of wave-particle duality, one of the central mysteries of quantum theory, the author claims that "in terms of the Invariant Set Postulate, the paradox is easily resolved, in principle at least". The paper and related talks given at the Perimeter Institute and University of Oxford also explores the role of gravity in quantum physics.

Critical reception
New Scientist quotes Bob Coeke of Oxford University as stating "What makes this really interesting is that it gets away from the usual debates over multiple universes and hidden variables and so on. It suggests there might be an underlying physical geometry that physics has just missed, which is radical and very positive". He added that "Palmer manages to explain some quantum phenomena, but he hasn't yet derived the whole rigid structure of the theory. This is really necessary."

Robert Spekkens has said: "I think his approach is really interesting and novel. Other physicists have shown how you can find a way out of the Kochen–Specker theorem, but this work actually provides a mechanism to explain the theorem."

The two opinions above are dated 2009. The third opinion, below, is dated 2018.

According to Todd Brun, it is a tall order, to make a serious rival to quantum mechanics, a really predictive theory, out of Palmer's ideas. This goal has not been achieved yet.

See also
Fractal cosmology

References

Fractals
Quantum mechanics
Fringe physics